Melisodera picipennis is a species of beetle in the family Carabidae. It is the only species in the genus Melisodera.

References

Psydrinae
Monotypic Carabidae genera